The , branded , is a luxury hybrid diesel multiple unit (DMU) sleeping-car excursion train operated by West Japan Railway Company (JR West) in Japan since 17 June 2017. With a capacity of 34 passengers, the train is used on excursions in the Keihanshin, Sanin, and Sanyo regions of western Japan.

Design
The train was built jointly by Kawasaki Heavy Industries and Kinki Sharyo.

Propulsion
The train is a ten-car self-propelled hybrid diesel multiple unit (DMU) train combining a diesel generator and battery storage power, allowing it to operate on the non-electrified Sanin Main Line.

Styling
The train styling was overseen by industrial designer  and architect and interior designer .

Logo
The train's logo design combines a stylized "M" with the angels used in the logo of JR West's Twilight Express sleeping car train, which operated from 1989 until March 2015.

Train formation
The ten-coach train consists of six sleeping cars, a lounge car, a dining car, and observation cars at either end of the train with open balconies. Five of the sleeping cars have three private suite rooms, while one car has a single luxury suite occupying the entire coach and featuring a bathtub and private balcony. The train formation is as shown below:

Cars 1, 5, 6, and 10 are powered. Cars 2, 3, 8, and 9, each have three double-occupancy "Twin" rooms, car 4 has two single-occupancy "Single" rooms and a universal design "Twin" room, and car 7 has one double-occupancy "Suite" room. In addition to the en-suite toilets provided in all rooms, cars 2, 3, 5, 8, and 9 have toilets for use by all passengers.

Catering

Tour routes

The train will initially be used on excursions in the Keihanshin, Sanin, and Sanyo regions of western Japan. The following five tour routes will be offered:
 Sanyo Course (Outbound)

 Sanyo Course (Inbound)

 Sanin Course (Outbound)

 Sanin Course (Inbound)

 Sanin & Sanyo Course

History

JR West first announced its plans to build a new luxury cruising train in May 2014. The name of the train, Twilight Express Mizukaze, and train logo were officially unveiled on 19 February 2015.

The first five intermediate cars of the ten-car trainset were delivered from the Kawasaki Heavy Industries factory in Kobe in March 2016. The two end cars, KiITe 87-1 and KiITe 87-2, were delivered from the Kinki Sharyo factory in Osaka in August 2016. Mainline test running commenced in late September, initially with the train formed as four cars.

See also
 List of named passenger trains of Japan
 Joyful Train, the generic name for excursion and charter trains in Japan
 Seven Stars in Kyushu, a luxury cruising train operated by JR Kyushu in Japan
 Train Suite Shiki-shima, a luxury sleeping car excursion train operated by JR East in Japan

References

External links

 

Named passenger trains of Japan
Hybrid multiple units of Japan
West Japan Railway Company
Train-related introductions in 2017
Kawasaki multiple units
Kinki Sharyo multiple units